Het Volk may refer to:
 Het Volk (newspaper), Flanders, Belgium
 Oomlop Het Volk, now called the Omloop Het Nieuwsblad, a semi-classic one-day bicycle race in Flanders, Belgium, sponsored by the newspaper
 Het Volk (political party), Transvaal political party (1907–1910)
 Het Volk (Netherlands), daily newspaper of the Dutch Social Democratic Workers' Party founded in 1900